"Is It a Crime?" is a song by English band Sade from their second studio album, Promise (1985). It was written by Sade Adu, Andrew Hale and Stuart Matthewman, and produced by Robin Miller. The song was released as the album's second single on 11 January 1986, by Epic Records.

Critical reception
Tanya Rena Jefferson of AXS stated, "'Is It a Crime' is a smooth jazz filled song that fills up your brain with soulful joy. Sade sings in confidence on how she is in love, and she is so in love that she wonders if it is a crime that she loves her lover so. The romantic mellow song has a great tempo that fills your ears with sudden relaxation and ease." Sophie Heawood of The Guardian commented that "Sade's penchant for the epic was fully indulged on this six-and-a-half-minute 1986 single, from its length to its metaphors: her love here is 'wider than Victoria Lake ... taller than the Empire State' – and, unsaid, clearly able to traverse half the globe as well." Frank Guan of Vulture commented, "The alternation between low/slow verse and high/loud chorus is so effective here you wonder if the Pixies hadn't learned a thing or two from this track. There's a kind of subtle but forceful politics in her assertion of the scale of her love: it exceeds all imperial figures."

Track listings
7-inch single
A. "Is It a Crime?" – 6:21
B. "Punch Drunk" – 5:25

12-inch single
A1. "Is It a Crime?" – 6:21
A2. "Wired" – 3:34
B. "Punch Drunk" – 5:25

Charts

Uses in pop culture
In 1988, the song was used in the pilot episode of the television series Midnight Caller entitled "Conversations with an Assassin".
The song was sampled in MF DOOM's 2004 album Mm..Food on the song "Kon Karne".

References

1980s ballads
1985 songs
1986 singles
Epic Records singles
Sade (band) songs
Songs written by Sade (singer)
Songs written by Stuart Matthewman
Soul ballads
Torch songs